Aleksander Gawronik (born 30 August 1948 in Poznań) is a Polish entrepreneur, politician and senator of the eighth assembly in the Polish senate.

Biography 
He was active in the Polish Socialist Youth Union, in 1966 he graduated from the Evening University of Marxism–Leninism. During the communist period, he was an activist of PZPR and a full-time SB employee. In 1977 he graduated from the Faculty of Law in the University of Warsaw. In 1976, Gawronik resigned from the Communist Party and was dismissed. He admits being employed by Polish security services for 25 days. He was friends with Deputy Prime Minister Ireneusz Sekuła. In March 1989, shortly after agreements by the government of Mieczysław Rakowski he decided to open the exchange offices, and launched in many places on the western border the first network of currency exchange points in Poland.

In 1989 Alexander Gawronika supported the editors of the weekly Wprost, in exchange for the weekly advertising space for his businesses. In 1990, he was ranked first on the list of the 100 richest Poles of the Wprost weekly; in the following years he held twice the 6th place (1991, 1992), 22nd place (1993) and 92nd place (1994).

After signing the contract with the German company "Tax-free" Poles buyer of goods in Germany could in his company offices receive 14% of their value, as a return of VAT. Aleksander Gawronik launched the company "Sezam", dealing with the protection of people and property and organizing the escort of valuable shipments. In 1991 he became the manager of the Art-B company, previously managed by Bogusław Bagsik and Andrzej Gąsiorowski.

In early parliamentary elections in 1993, he was elected a senator of the third republic, running as an independent candidate. He co-created, among others with Zbigniew Religa, Independent Senators' Club. He sat on the National Economy Committee, Rules and Senate Affairs Committee and Subcommittee on Regional Policy.

Penal proceedings 

In 1991, the officers of the Office for State Protection detained him in connection with the accusation of appropriation of property worth about 7.6 billion zlotys to the detriment of Art-B and grabbing 10 billion zlotys, which he was to take unlawfully from the debtor of this company. He was released after three weeks for a property guarantee. In 1993, his trial began.

In 2000, at the request of the prosecutor of the District Prosecutor's Office in Słubice, a search was carried out in the offices and warehouses of the company belonging to him. In 2001, Aleksander Gawronik was arrested and subsequently detained on suspicion of committing customs and tax fraud.

The district court in Słubice in 2004 sentenced him to 8 years imprisonment and 200 daily rates for PLN 250 fine, for extorting over PLN 9 million of undue VAT. The former senator did not plead guilty, claiming that his employees were guilty of fraud. Earlier, his trial was completed regarding the misappropriation of assets to the detriment of Art-B, in which he was imprisoned for 3 years and 8 months. He obtained a conditional early release in 2009, 11 months before the end of his sentence. In 2011, he was given a penalty of 350 days imprisonment in exchange for a fine resulting from the judgment of the Warsaw-Mokotów District Court. Aleksander Gawronik was sent to serve a sentence in 2012.

In 2014, he was arrested in connection with the intent to present a plea of incitement to the murder of journalist Jarosław Ziętara. In 2015, the prosecutor brought charges against him in this case. He is currently undergoing trial for murder.

References 

Members of the Senate of Poland 1993–1997
Living people
1948 births
University of Warsaw alumni
Businesspeople from Poznań
Polish United Workers' Party members
Politicians from Poznań